The 2006 Star World Championship was held at the St. Francis Yacht Club in San Francisco, United States between September 27 and October 8, 2006. The championship was administered by the World Sailing.

Results

See also
Star World Championship

External links
 Official website
 Results @ starclass.org
 

Star World Championships
Star World Championship
Star World Championships in the United States